Renata Voráčová (born 6 October 1983) is a Czech professional tennis player.

Voráčová has won 11 doubles titles on the WTA Tour and three on WTA 125 tournaments, as well as 15 singles and 56 doubles titles on the ITF Circuit. On 11 October 2010, she reached a career-high singles ranking of world No. 74. On 21 August 2017, she peaked at No. 29 in the WTA doubles rankings.

Background and early life
Voracova's father, Frantisek, owns a gas company, while her mother, Vlasta, manages a sports center. She also has brother, David, that is a professional dancer and still studying. She started playing tennis at age of 7.

Junior achievements
As a junior, Voráčová reached a career-high ranking of world No. 4 in singles and No. 3 in doubles. One of the highlights of her junior tennis career was winning the 2001 French Open doubles title, alongside Petra Cetkovská.

Career

2017
At the Wimbledon Championships, Voráčová made the second week of a Grand Slam tournament for the first time in her career, with partner Makoto Ninomiya reaching the semifinals of the ladies' doubles. They lost in three sets to Chan Hao-ching and Monica Niculescu. Due to her surprise run, Voráčová reached a new career-high ranking of 32 on July 17, after 17 years on the WTA Tour.

2022
Voráčová started her 2022 season at the Melbourne Summer Set 2, where she lost in the first round of the doubles tournament. Her Australian visa was later cancelled after her medical exemption from Australia's vaccination rules was rejected by the Australian government, forcing Voráčová to withdraw from the Australian Open amid her deportation.

Performance timelines

Only main-draw results in WTA Tour, Grand Slam tournaments, Fed Cup/Billie Jean King Cup and Olympic Games are included in win–loss records.

Singles
Current through the suspension of the 2020 WTA Tour.

Doubles

WTA career finals

Doubles: 21 (11 titles, 10 runner-ups)

WTA Challenger finals

Doubles: 7 (3 titles, 4 runner-ups)

ITF Circuit finals

Singles: 29 (15 titles, 14 runner–ups)

Doubles: 91 (57 titles, 34 runner–ups)

ITF Junior Circuit

Junior Grand Slam finals

Girls' doubles: 1 (title)

Notes

References

External links

 
 

1983 births
Living people
Sportspeople from Zlín
Czech female tennis players
French Open junior champions
Grand Slam (tennis) champions in girls' doubles
People deported from Australia
21st-century Czech women